A rocket launcher is a device used to launch a rocket. It may also refer to:

Rocket launcher jump, a movement technique used in first-person shooter video games
Rocket Launcher, a maneuver in professional wrestling
If I Had a Rocket Launcher, a 1984 song by Bruce Cockburn